The 2022–23 Vancouver Canucks season is the 53rd season for the National Hockey League franchise that was established on May 22, 1970.

Standings

Divisional standings

Conference standings

Schedule and results

Preseason
The preseason schedule was published on July 5, 2022.

Regular season
The regular season schedule was published on July 6, 2022.

Player statistics
As of February 28, 2023

Skaters

Goaltenders

†Denotes player spent time with another team before joining the Canucks. Stats reflect time with the Canucks only.
‡Denotes player was traded mid-season. Stats reflect time with the Canucks only.
Bold/italics denotes franchise record.

Roster

Awards and honours

Awards

Milestones

Records

Transactions
The Canucks have been involved in the following transactions during the 2022–23 season.

Key:

 Contract is entry-level.
 Contract initially takes effect in the 2023–24 season.

Trades

Players acquired

Players lost

Signings

Draft picks

Below are the Vancouver Canucks' selections at the 2022 NHL Entry Draft, which was held on July 7 and 8, 2022, at Bell Centre in Montreal, Quebec.

Notes:
 The Vancouver Canucks' second-round pick went to the Minnesota Wild as the result of a trade on March 21, 2022, that sent Jack McBain to Arizona in exchange for this pick.

References

Vancouver Canucks seasons
Vancouver Canucks
Canucks